"Down So Long" is a song written by American singer Jewel and produced by Patrick Leonard for Jewel's second album, Spirit (1998). Jewel wrote the song in 1992, when she was 18 years old. This was the second single that Jewel had not re-recorded vocals for its single release. The single release received a very slight change in the instrumental and was released on March 16, 1999.

A commercial single was not released within the United States, but the song peaked at number 59 on the Billboard Hot 100 chart regardless. It also peaked at number 10 on the Billboard Adult Top 40 chart and number 21 on the Pop Songs chart. Outside the United States, "Down So Long" charted successfully in the United Kingdom and New Zealand, reaching numbers 38 and 16, respectively, but it failed to break the top 100 in Australia. In Canada, the song reached number seven, becoming the second top-ten single from Spirit after the number-one single "Hands". It also reached number seven on Canada's Adult Contemporary chart.

Track listings
US promo CD
 "Down So Long" (album version) – 4:16

UK CD single
 "Down So Long"
 "Fat Boy" (live)
 "I'm Sensitive" (live)

European CD single
 "Down So Long"
 "Fat Boy" (live)

Credits and personnel
Credits are adapted from the Spirit album booklet.

Studios
 Recorded at Groove Masters (Santa Monica, California) and Ocean Way Recording (Hollywood, California)
 Mixed at Ocean Way Recording (Hollywood, California)
 Mastered at Gateway Mastering (Portland, Maine, US)

Personnel

 Jewel Kilcher – writing, vocals
 Patrick Leonard – electric piano, production
 Jude Cole – acoustic guitar
 James Harrah – electric guitar
 David Channing – electric guitar
 Josh Clayton-Felt – electric guitar

 Paul Bushnell – bass
 Brian MacLeod – drums
 Luis Conte – percussion
 Ross Hogarth – engineering, mixing
 Bob Ludwig – mastering

Charts

Weekly charts

Year-end charts

Release history

References

External links
 Official music video via YouTube

1998 songs
1999 singles
Atlantic Records singles
Jewel (singer) songs
Songs written by Jewel (singer)